The Portrait of a Young Man is a painting by the Italian Renaissance artist Sandro Botticelli, dated between 1470 and 1475. It is housed in the Palazzo Pitti of Florence.

Variously attributed to different painters, it was eventually included in Botticelli's works. It is one of the first known three-quarters portraits in western European art.

See also
Botticelli's portraits at National Gallery, London, and National Gallery of Art, Washington.

External links
Palazzo Pitti – Official website

1470s paintings
Young Man, Botticelli
Paintings in the collection of the Galleria Palatina
Young Man